Antxon Olarrea is a Spanish syntactician and a professor of linguistics within the Department of Spanish and Portuguese at the University of Arizona.  He is the author of several books and articles on theoretical linguistics and Spanish morphology and syntax. He also has a solid career as an educator and is the recipient of numerous national teaching awards in Linguistics.

Career
Olarrea holds a PhD in Linguistics from the University of Washington. Currently, he holds the title of Professor in the Department of Spanish and Portuguese at the University of Arizona and is also a member of the faculty of the Department of Linguistics, the Second Language Acquisition and Teaching (SLAT) Program, and the Center for Latin American Studies. His research interests include formal studies of Spanish syntax, and the biological origins of language.

Prior to joining the faculty at the University of Arizona, Olarrea taught at the University of North Carolina at Charlotte.

Books

References

Syntacticians
University of Washington alumni
University of Arizona faculty
Living people
Year of birth missing (living people)